In mathematics, the matrix sign function is a matrix function on square matrices analogous to the complex sign function.

It was introduced by J.D. Roberts in 1971 as a tool for model reduction and for solving Lyapunov and Algebraic Riccatia equation in a technical report of Cambridge University, which was later published in a journal in 1980.

Definition 
The matrix sign function is a generalization of the complex signum function

to the matrix valued analogue . Although the sign function is not analytic, the matrix function is well defined for all matrices that have no eigenvalue on the imaginary axis, see for example the Jordan-form-based definition (where the derivatives are all zero).

Properties 
Theorem: Let , then .

Computational methods 
The function can be computed with generic methods for matrix functions, but there are also specialized methods.

Newton iteration 
If we apply the Babylonian method to compute the square root of the matrix , that is, the iteration , and define the new iterate , we arrive at the iteration

,

where typically . Convergence is global, and locally it is quadratic.

The Newton iteration uses the explicit inverse of the iterates .

Newton–Schulz iteration 
To avoid the need of an explicit inverse used in the Newton iteration, the inverse can be approximated with one step of the Newton iteration for the inverse, derived by Schulz(de) in 1933. Substituting this approximation into the previous method, the new method becomes

.

Convergence is (still) quadratic, but only local (guaranteed for ).

Applications

Solutions of Sylvester equations 

Proof sketch: The result follows from the similarity transform

since

The theorem is, naturally, also applicable to the Lyapunov equation.

Solutions of algebraic Riccati equations 
There is a similar result applicable to the algebraic Riccati equation, . Define  as

Under the assumption that  are Hermitian and there exists a unique stabilizing solution, in the sense that  is stable, that solution is given by the over-determined, but consistent, linear system

Proof sketch: The similarity transform

and the stability of  implies that

for some matrix .

Computations of matrix square-root 

References 

Matrix theory
Linear algebra